Hugh Spear Pemberton (June 1890 – 15 January 1956) was an English physician remembered for describing Pemberton's sign.

Biography 
Hugh Pemberton qualified MB ChB from the University of Liverpool in 1913 and started working at the David Lewis Northern Hospital in Liverpool. During World War I he served in the Royal Army Medical Corps, returning to the Northern Hospital after the war. He became a Member of the Royal College of Physicians in 1921 and was appointed consultant in 1924. He was also a lecturer in clinical medicine at the University of Liverpool. He became a Fellow of the Royal College of Physicians in 1941. He founded the diabetic clinic at the Northern Hospital in 1922, and published articles on diabetes, thyrotoxicosis and peripheral vascular disease, including the description of his eponymous sign in 1946. He retired in 1955, and died suddenly at home in Cheshire in 1956.

References

External links
 

20th-century English medical doctors
1890 births
1956 deaths